Bernie May may refer to:
 Bernie May (politician)
 Bernie May (geneticist)